Rolandra is a genus of flowering plants in the Vernonieae within the daisy family.

Species
The only known species is Rolandra fruticosa, native to Central and South America plus the West Indies. It is also reportedly naturalized in Japan and Java.

formerly included
see Ichthyothere Trichospira 
 Rolandra reptans Willd. ex Less. - Trichospira verticillata (L.) S.F.Blake
 Rolandra septans Willd. ex Less. - Trichospira verticillata (L.) S.F.Blake
 Rolandra terminalis Spreng. - Ichthyothere terminalis (Spreng.) S.F.Blake

References

Vernonieae
Monotypic Asteraceae genera